was an old province in the area of Iwate and Akita Prefectures. It was sometimes called , with Rikuzen and Mutsu Provinces.

Rikuchu covered most of modern-day Iwate Prefecture: with the exceptions of Ninohe District, Ninohe City, the northern portion of Hachimantai City, and the northern portion of Kuzumaki Town; Kesen District, Rikuzentakata City, Ōfunato City, and the southern portion of Kamaishi City; but also including Kazuno City and Kosaka Town in Akita Prefecture.

Rikuchū was created shortly after the Meiji Restoration out of part of Mutsu Province.

History
January 19, 1869: Rikuchu Province is separated from Mutsu Province
1872: A census estimates the population at 510,521

Historical districts
 Akita Prefecture
 Kazuno District (鹿角郡)
 Iwate Prefecture
 Isawa District (胆沢郡)
 Iwai District (磐井郡)
 Higashiiwai District (東磐井郡) - dissolved
 Nishiiwai District (西磐井郡)
 Iwate District (岩手郡)
 Kitaiwate District (北岩手郡) - merged with Minamiiwate District to re-create Iwate District on March 29, 1896
 Minamiiwate District (南岩手郡) - merged with Kitaiwate District to re-create Iwate District on March 29, 1896
 Esashi District (江刺郡) - dissolved
 Kunohe District (九戸郡)
 Kitakunohe District (北九戸郡) - merged with Minamikunohe District to re-create Kunohe District on March 29, 1896
 Minamikunohe District (南九戸郡) - merged with Kitakunohe District to re-create Kunohe District on March 29, 1896
 Shiwa District (紫波郡)
 Hienuki District (稗貫郡) - dissolved
 Hei District (閉伊郡)
 Higashihei District (東閉伊郡) - merged with Kitahei and Nakahei Districts to become Shimohei District (下閉伊郡) on March 29, 1896
 Kitahei District (北閉伊郡) - merged with Higashihei and Nakahei Districts to become Shimohei District on March 29, 1896
 Minamihei District (南閉伊郡) - merged with Nishihei District to become Kamihei District (上閉伊郡) on March 29, 1896
 Nakahei District (中閉伊郡) - merged with Higashihei and Kitahei Districts to become Shimohei District on March 29, 1896
 Nishihei District (西閉伊郡) - merged with Minamihei District to become Kamihei District on March 29, 1896
 Waga District (和賀郡)
 Higashiwaga District (東和賀郡) - merged with Nishiwaga District to re-create Waga District on March 29, 1896
 Nishiwaga District (西和賀郡) - merged with Higashiwaga District to re-create Waga District on March 29, 1896

See also
 Rikuchu Kaigan National Park
 Sanriku
 List of Provinces of Japan

Notes

References
 Nussbaum, Louis-Frédéric and Käthe Roth. (2005).  Japan encyclopedia. Cambridge: Harvard University Press. ;  OCLC 58053128

Other websites

  Murdoch's map of provinces, 1903

Former provinces of Japan